Winchester Airport  was located  south of Winchester, Ontario, Canada, south of Ottawa. The airport had two runways, one paved and one grass.

The aerodrome was permanently closed as of May 15, 2012. The NOTAM entry published by NAV Canada reads: CNA8 WEF 2012 MAY 15 0401 AMEND PUB: AD PERM CLSD

The paved runway appears to have been removed, but hangar and other buildings remain on site after the closure.

See also
 List of airports in the Ottawa area

References

External links
Airport website
Page about this airport on COPA's Places to Fly airport directory

Defunct airports in Ontario